The Meerkats, also known as Meerkats: The Movie, is a feature-length 2008 British wildlife fiction film which anthropomorphises the daily struggles of a clan of meerkats in the Kalahari Desert. It was produced by BBC Films, and filmed by the award-winning BBC Natural History Unit. It is the debut directorial feature of James Honeyborne, previously a producer of natural history programmes for television. The worldwide premiere was held at the Dinard Film Festival, France in October 2008, expanding to a wide release the following week. The film was released in 2009, on 7 August in the UK. This was dedicated to actor Paul Newman, the narrator of the film, who died in 2008, shortly before this movie was released making it his final film role.

Plot
The documentary follows the adventure of a young meerkat named Kolo who is forced to leave his home by a group of meerkats who wanted more territory. Lost in the African savannah, he tries to reunite with his family, but encounters large, fierce, and deadly creatures.

Production
The Meerkats was announced in November 2006 as BBC Films and The Weinstein Company agreed a co-financing deal for the film, with The Weinstein Company also handling international distribution. The year-long principal photography began on location in the Kalahari Desert, South Africa in the same month. It became the Natural History Unit's first feature-length wildlife fiction based on original material, and followed the successes of Earth (2007) and Deep Blue (2003) which were both companion pieces to BBC television series. The script was written by Alexander McCall Smith, author of many books set in Botswana. Paul Newman provides the narration, which was recorded at a studio near his home shortly before his death. The Meerkats was the final film credit of Newman's long career.

Meerkat Manor: The Story Begins, a second feature-length wildlife film on meerkats, was also released in 2008. It was produced by Animal Planet, Discovery Films and Oxford Scientific Films, the makers of Meerkat Manor, but was not screened in theatres. BBC Films' Joe Oppenheimer, a producer of The Meerkats, has stated that the two films are very different in character (the BBC and Discovery originally planned to collaborate, but couldn't agree on a common ground). James Honeyborne has described The Meerkats as "a stand-alone, blue-chip wildlife film from the ground up. It will be immersive. There will be a huge sense of place on a massive scale. You will really see real wild animals."

Awards 
 Winner, Grand Prix Earth, Special Award, Tokyo International Film Festival
 Best of Festival, Wild Talk Africa Film Festival
 Winner, Best Editing, Wild Talk Africa Film Festival
 Winner, Best Sound Design, Wild Talk Africa Film Festival
 Nomination, Best Music, Wild Talk Africa Film Festival
 Nomination, Best Script, Wild Talk Africa Film Festival
 Winner, Best Editing, Jackson Hole Wildlife Film Festival
 Nomination, Best Writing, Jackson Hole Wildlife Film Festival
 Winner, Silver Teton, Jackson Hole Wildlife Film Festival

Reception
Writing in The Guardian reviewer Philip French noted that the "... nature movie made in the Kalahari desert has some good footage but is more Disney-anthropomorphic than Attenborough.."

References

External links
 
 
 

2008 films
British documentary films
Films about meerkats
BBC Film films
Documentary films about mammals
2000s English-language films
2000s British films